Türkoğlu is a Turkish surname. Notable people with the surname include:
Ece Türkoğlu (born 1999), Turkish female footballer
Hedo Türkoğlu (born 1979), Turkish basketball player
Ümit Türkoğlu (born 1981), Turkish basketball player

Turkish-language surnames